The 1999 Appalachian State Mountaineers football team was an American football team that represented Appalachian State University as a member of the Southern Conference (SoCon) during the 1999 NCAA Division I-AA football season. In their 11th year under head coach Jerry Moore, the Mountaineers compiled an overall record of 9–3, with a conference mark of 7–1, and finished as SoCon co-champion.

Schedule

References

Appalachian State
Appalachian State Mountaineers football seasons
Southern Conference football champion seasons
Appalachian State Mountaineers football